Clube Sociedade Esportiva, commonly referred to as CSE, is a Brazilian professional football club based in Palmeira dos Índios, Alagoas. It competes in the Série D, the fourth tier of Brazilian football, as well as in the Campeonato Alagoano, the top flight of the Alagoas state football league.

The club was formerly known as Centro Social Esportivo.

History
The club was founded on 21 June 1947, as Centro Social Esportivo. The club was renamed Clube Sociedade Esportiva on 7 May 1997, as a way to get rid of the debts with the Federal Government and other creditors. CSE won the Campeonato Alagoano Second Level in 2002.

Achievements

 Campeonato Alagoano Second Level:
 Winners (1): 2002

Stadium
Clube Sociedade Esportiva play their home games at Estádio Juca Sampaio. The stadium has a maximum capacity of 8,000 people.

References

Association football clubs established in 1947
Football clubs in Alagoas
1947 establishments in Brazil